Otsego  may refer to:

Places
United States
 Otsego County (disambiguation)
 Otsego Township (disambiguation)
 Cities and towns: 
 Otsego, Michigan 
 Otsego, Minnesota
 Otsego, New York
 Otsego, Muskingum County, Ohio
 Otsego, Wood County, Ohio
 Otsego, Wisconsin, a town
 Otsego (community), Wisconsin, an unincorporated community

Ships
SS Otsego

See also 
 Otsego Lake (disambiguation)
 Otsego Hall, estate
 Otego (disambiguation)